Bob or Bobby Johnson may refer to:

Arts and entertainment
 Bob Johnson (actor) (1920–1993), voice actor noted for Mission: Impossible mission messages
 Bob Johnston (1932–2015), American record producer
 Bob Johnson (musician) (born 1944), British guitarist
 Robert L. Johnson (born 1946), founder of Black Entertainment Television
 Bob Johnson, a fictional father from the animated series Squirrel Boy
 Bob Johnson, a professional name of Neil Kaplan (active from 1993), American voice actor

Politics
 Bob A. Johnson (1945–2017), American politician and school social worker
 Bob Johnson (Arkansas state representative) (born 1953), member of the Arkansas House of Representatives since 2015
 Bob Johnson (Arkansas state senator) (born 1962), member of the Arkansas State Senate from 2001 to 2011 and the Arkansas House of Representatives from 1995 to 2000

Sports

American football
 Bob Johnson (American football) (born 1946), former American football center
 Bobby Johnson (born 1951), American football coach
 Bobby Johnson (defensive back) (born 1960), American football defensive back
 Bobby Johnson (wide receiver) (born 1961), American football wide receiver
 Bobby Johnson (American football coach) (born c. 1973), American football offensive line coach

Australian rules football
 Bob Johnson (Australian footballer, born 1902) (1902–1981), Australian rules footballer
 Bob Johnson (Australian footballer, born 1907) (1907–1988), Australian rules footballer for Port Adelaide
 Bob Johnson (Australian footballer, born 1935) (1935–2001), Australian rules footballer

Baseball
 Bob Johnson (outfielder) (1905–1982), known as "Indian Bob Johnson"
 Bob Johnson (first baseman), Negro League baseball player of the 1940s
 Bob Johnson (infielder) (1936–2019), American professional baseball player
 Bob Johnson (pitcher) (born 1943), former professional baseball player
 Bob Johnson (catcher) (born 1959), retired Major League Baseball catcher

Basketball
 Bob Johnson (basketball, born 1917) (1917–2000), American professional player for the NBL's Akron Wingfoots
 Bob Johnson (basketball, born 1927), American college head coach for Pittsburg State
 Bob Johnson (Seattle basketball), American college head coach for Seattle

Other sports
 Bob Johnson (footballer, born 1905) (1905–1987), English football forward who played for Southport and Darlington
 Bob Johnson (footballer, born 1911) (1911–1982), English football defender who played for Burnley
 Bob Johnson (ice hockey, born 1931) (1931–1991), Hall of Fame coach, known as Badger Bob Johnson
 Bob Johnson (ice hockey, born 1948), goaltender

Others
 Bob Johnson (butcher) (1940–2001), British businessman
 Bob Johnson (pilot) (1917–2014), fighter pilot with the Royal Canadian Air Force
 Bob Johnson (psychiatrist), British psychiatrist
 Bob Johnson (weather forecaster), British weather forecaster
 Robert Royce Johnson (1928–2016), engineer, computer pioneer, and professor; inventor of the Johnson counter

See also
 Robert Johnson (disambiguation)
 Rob Johnson (disambiguation)
 List of people with surname Johnson